Josep Grau-Garriga (Sant Cugat del Vallès, February 18, 1929 - Angers, Pays del Loire, August 29, 2011) was a Catalan textile artist who cultivated various techniques: painting, drawing, engraving, wall painting, sculpture and above all tapestry. He was the director of the Escola Catalana del Tapís (Catalan School of Tapestry) and exhibited his works around the world.

Exhibitions 

 1964. Sala Gaspar. Barcelona
 1967. General Directorate Exhibition Hall of Fine Arts. Madrid
 1968. Sala F. Domingo. Sao Paulo (Brazil)
 1968/1969/1970/1972/1975. La Demeure Gallery. Paris
 1970. The Córdoba Museum. Lincoln. Massachusetts. (USA)
 1970. The Houston Fine Arts Museum. Houston. (USA)
 1971/75. The Birmingham Museum of Fine Arts. Birmingham. (USA)
 1971/73/74/77/83. Arras Gallery. New York (USA)
 1972. Casa de la Vall. Andorra la Vella (Andorra)
 1972. Antonana Gallery. Caracas (Venezuela)
 1973. René Metrás Gallery. Barcelona
 1973. Textile Museum. Terrassa
 1973. Old Hospital of the Holy Cross. Barcelona
 1974. Los Angeles Country Museum. Los Angeles. (USA)
 1979. Febo Gallery. Sant Cugat del Vallès
 1979. Fucares Gallery. Almagro (Spain)
 1981. UNESCO Palace. Paris
 1982/85. Cloisters of the Royal Monastery. Sant Cugat del Vallès
 1982. Carcassonne (France)
 1987. Rufino Tamayo Museum. Mexico D.F
 1988. Palau Robert. Barcelona
 1989. Jean Lurçat Museum. Angers (France)
 1990. Museum of History. Sabadell
 1990/96/99. Canals, Art Gallery. San Cugat
 1992. Can Mulà Cultural Center. Mollet del Vallès
 1992. Punto Gallery. Valencia
 1992. Franciscan Cultural Center of Abidja. Abidja (Ivory Coast)
 1993. Temple Romà. Vic
 1999. Benassar Gallery. Madrid
 1999. Blanquerna Gallery. Madrid
 1999. Canals Art Gallery, Sant Cugat
 1999. Galerie Xavier Delannoy, La Garde-Freinet (French)
 2002. Abbaye de Ronceray and Musée Jean Lurçat d'Angers, Angers (France)
 2009. Abbey of Saint-Florent-le-Vieil (France).
 2010. Musée des Beaux-Arts d'Angers, Cabinet d'arts graphiques, Angers (France)
 2015. Michel Soskine Inc., Madrid.
 2022- MACBA Museum, Barcelona

References 

Tapestry artists
Artists from Catalonia
Sant Cugat del Vallès